Kilbride may refer to the following places:

Canada
Kilbride, St. John's, Newfoundland and Labrador
Kilbride (electoral district), for the House of Assembly of Newfoundland and Labrador
Kilbride, Ontario, community near Burlington
Castle Kilbride, historic house in Baden, Ontario

Ireland and Northern Ireland
Kilbride, County Antrim, village in County Antrim, Northern Ireland
Kilbride, Trim, County Meath, settlement near Trim in Dunderry parish
Kilbride, Ratoath, County Meath
Kilbride, County Cavan, townland and civil parish in County Cavan, Ireland
Kilbride, County Down, townland in County Down, Northern Ireland
Kilbride, County Waterford, townland in Ireland
Kilbride, County Westmeath (civil parish), in Fartullagh, County Westmeath, Ireland
Kilbride, County Westmeath, townland in Kilbride, Fartullagh, County Westmeath, Ireland
Kilbride, County Wicklow, village in Leinster, Ireland, also called Manor Kilbride
Kilbride, County Wicklow, a townland in the Barony of Arklow, County Wicklow
Kilbride, County Wicklow, a Civil Parish in the Barony of Arklow, County Wicklow
Kilbride, County Wicklow, a townland in the Barony of Rathdown, County Wicklow

Scotland
Kilbride, Skye, Scotland
Kilbride Castle, near east Kilbride; abandoned in the 15th century

See also 
East Kilbride, Scotland
West Kilbride, Scotland